Dusner is a language spoken in the village of Dusner in the province of West Papua, Indonesia. Dusner is highly endangered, and has been reported to have just three remaining speakers.

Sociolinguistic situation
The language is highly endangered with only three speakers reported to be remaining. In 2011, researchers from Oxford University's Faculty of Linguistics, Philology and Phonetics  began a project to document the vocabulary and grammar of the language, in collaboration with UNIPA (State University of Papua) and UNCEN (Cenderawasih University, Papua). The project outputs were a vocabulary, a published grammar, and a website documenting the language.

Phonology
The phoneme inventory of Dusner consists of five vowels and 19 consonants (five of which are only attested in loanwords from Indonesian/Papuan Malay).

(Phonèmes in parenthèses in the table are only attested in loanwords from Papuan Malay)

There is no tone in the language. The phonology of the language has a high number of complex syllable onsets, some of them contravening the Sonority Sequencing Principle.

Morphology

References

External links 

South Halmahera–West New Guinea languages
Languages of western New Guinea
Cenderawasih Bay
Papua (province) culture
Endangered Austronesian languages